Islamic Virtue Party (in Arabic حزب الفضيلة الإسلامي العراقي, transliterated as Ḥizb al-Faḍīla al-Islāmiyya al-ʿIrāqi or just Al-Faḍīla Party) is an Iraqi political party.

After the 2003 Iraq War, the Hizb al-Fadhila al-Islami (Islamic Virtue Party) was formed.

In the January 2005 parliamentary elections the party achieved 28 seats in the TNA (within the United Iraqi Alliance), as well as representation in the Baghdad, Karbala, Najaf, Al-Qadisiyah, Maysan, Dhi Qar, Al-Muthanna, and Basra provincial councils.

Party goals
 Guaranteeing freedom and prosperity to the Iraqi society in accordance with Shari'a standards
 Spreading intellectual and political awareness among the Iraqis and deepening awareness of their religion and homeland
 Leading the Iraqis toward an integration of consciousness and belief on their way to a better moral and material future, in a society enjoying freedom, justice, and independence

System of governance

A constitutional, parliamentary, pluralistic system that is founded on elections, and limited by Shari'a. Federalism is not preferred but might be the best solution at this time.

Liberties & civil rights

"The constitution must guarantee human rights and the basic freedoms, which do not contradict the Islamic Shari'a and common customs." Human rights should be guaranteed "in a manner that does not distort the nature of Iraqi society and the commandments of Islam, the true religion."

Minorities's rights

The party does not like to use the term "minority". All are Iraqis and have equal rights and obligations. The party "believes in the cultural and national rights of the Kurds in a way that harmonizes with their circumstances and fits into the framework of a unified Iraq, in which Arabs and Kurds live in brotherhood and share equal rights of citizenship and equal and equivalent obligations."

Law & judiciary

The source of laws is the Shari'a, or at least the laws should not contradict it.

Distribution of wealth

"The entirety of natural resources belongs to the public sector. [...] All movable assets attained from natural resources can be acquired only through labor. They can also be acquired through inheritance, indemnity for damages, and other forms of acquisition."

Iraq's identity

"The land and people of Iraq must remain unified. [...] Iraq belongs to all Iraqis. [...] The constitution must emphasize the Islamic identity of the country."

De-Ba'thification

Ba'thists who committed crimes against the Iraqi people must be prosecuted by law and justly penalized. Ba'thists who did not commit any crime against the Iraqi people should be slowly re-integrated into Iraq's political life.

Occupation

"[It] is a comprehensive project of Western civilizing procedures aimed at changing ways of thinking and the present culture, in Iraq in particular and in the whole Middle East in general." It needs to be unmasked and resisted, but in a planned and scientific manner. Both violent and non-violent resistance are important.

Terrorism

"[The] terrorism that broke out in Iraqi society was not a product of current confessional or intellectual preconditions in Iraq. It is rather a phenomenon that grew up outside Iraq and crept into Iraq within the range of regional and international interests. [...] The Shari'a forbids terrorism."

Regional/international relations

 Foreign policy should be based on the Arabic and Islamic affiliation of Iraq.
 Especially friendly relations should be established with Iraq's neighbors.
 Relations should be maintained with all countries except Israel.

Al-Fadhila and Independent Elite Alliance
In the 2014 Parliamentary elections, the Islamic Virtue Party took part in the elections under the banner of Al-Fadhila and Independent Elite Alliance (in Arabic إئتلاف الفضيلة والنخب المستقلة - transliterated as I'tilaf al-Fadhila wal Nukhab al-Mustaqilla). Hachem Abed al-Hassan Ali Hachem was appointed as head of the coalition.

It went on to win 6 seats in the 2014 Iraqi Parliament out of a total of 328 seats.

References

Shia Islamic political parties
Political parties established in 1991
Islamic political parties in Iraq
1991 establishments in Iraq